This is a list of the members of German supergroup rock opera project Avantasia.

Ghostlights Members 

 Tobias Sammet
Lead vocals (2001–present)
Bass guitar (2007–present)
Keyboards (2001–2002)
 Sascha Paeth
Guitars (2007–present)
Producer (2007–present)
 Felix Bohnke
Drums (2010, 2015–present)
 Miro
Keyboards (2007–present)
Orchestration (2007–present)

The Mystery of Time Members 

 Tobias Sammet
Lead vocals (2001–present)
Bass guitar (2007–present)
Keyboards (2001–2002)
 Sascha Paeth
Guitars (2007–present)
Producer (2007–present)
 Russell Gilbrook
Drums (2013–present)
 Miro
Keyboards (2007–present)
Orchestration (2007–present)

The Wicked Trilogy Members 

 Tobias Sammet
Lead vocals (2001–present)
Bass guitar (2007–present)
Keyboards (2001–2002)
 Sascha Paeth
Guitars (2007–present)
Producer (2007–present)
 Eric Singer
Drums (2002, 2007–2010)
Vocals (2007)
 Miro
Keyboards (2007–present)
Orchestration (2007–present)

The Metal Opera members

 Tobias Sammet
Lead vocals (2001–present)
Keyboards (2001–2002)
 Henjo Richter
Guitars (2001–2002, 2007–2010)
Markus Grosskopf
Bass guitar (2001–2002)
 Alex Holzwarth
Drums (2001–2002, 2010)

The Scarecrow World Tour (2008) 

 Tobias Sammet - vocals
 Andre Matos - vocals
 Jørn Lande - vocals
 Kai Hansen - vocals (only shows in Europe)
 Bob Catley - vocals (only shows in Europe and Asia)
 Oliver Hartmann - vocals & guitars
 Amanda Somerville - vocals & backing vocals
 Cloudy Yang - backing vocals
 Sascha Paeth - guitars
 Robert Hunecke-Rizzo - bass
 Miro - keyboards
 Felix Bohnke - drums

The Metal Opera Comes to Town Tour (2010) 

 Tobias Sammet - vocals
 Michael Kiske - vocals
 Jørn Lande - vocals
 Bob Catley - vocals
 Kai Hansen - vocals & guitars
 Oliver Hartmann - vocals & guitars
 Amanda Somerville - vocals
 Sascha Paeth - guitars
 Miro - keyboards
 Robert Hunecke-Rizzo - bass
 Felix Bohnke - drums

The Mystery World Tour (2013) 

 Tobias Sammet - vocals
 Michael Kiske - vocals
 Bob Catley - vocals
 Ronnie Atkins - vocals (only shows in Europe and Japan)
 Eric Martin - vocals
 Thomas Rettke - vocals, backing vocals
 Oliver Hartmann - vocals, backing vocals, guitars
 Amanda Somerville - vocals, backing vocals
 Sascha Paeth - guitars, backing vocals
 Miro - keyboards, backing vocals
 Andre Neygenfind – bass, backing vocals
 Felix Bohnke - drums

Ghostlights World Tour (2016) 

 Tobias Sammet - vocals
 Michael Kiske - vocals
 Jørn Lande - vocals
 Bob Catley - vocals (only shows in Europe and Asia)
 Ronnie Atkins - vocals 
 Eric Martin - vocals
 Herbie Langhans - vocals, backing vocals
 Oliver Hartmann - vocals, backing vocals, guitars
 Amanda Somerville - vocals, backing vocals
 Sascha Paeth - guitars, backing vocals
 Miro - keyboards, backing vocals
 Andre Neygenfind – bass, backing vocals
 Felix Bohnke - drums

Moonglow World Tour (2019) 

 Tobias Sammet - vocals
 Jørn Lande - vocals
 Bob Catley - vocals 
 Ronnie Atkins - vocals 
 Eric Martin - vocals
 Geoff Tate - vocals
 Herbie Langhans - vocals, backing vocals
 Adrienne Cowan - vocals, backing vocals
 Ina Morgan - backing vocals
 Oliver Hartmann - vocals, backing vocals, guitars
 Sascha Paeth - guitars, backing vocals
 Miro - keyboards, backing vocals
 Andre Neygenfind – bass, backing vocals
 Felix Bohnke - drums

Moonflower World Tour (2022) 

 Tobias Sammet - vocals
 Jørn Lande - vocals
 Bob Catley - vocals 
 Ronnie Atkins - vocals 
 Eric Martin - vocals
 Ralf Scheepers - vocals
 Herbie Langhans - vocals, backing vocals
 Adrienne Cowan - vocals, backing vocals
 Ina Morgan - backing vocals
 Oliver Hartmann - vocals, backing vocals, guitars
 Sascha Paeth - guitars, backing vocals
 Miro - keyboards, backing vocals
 Andre Neygenfind – bass, backing vocals
 Felix Bohnke - drums

Vocalists

Musicians

References 

Avantasia